Pak Jong-hun (born 10 March 1948) is a North Korean former footballer. He competed in the men's tournament at the 1976 Summer Olympics.

References

External links
 
 

1948 births
Living people
North Korean footballers
North Korea international footballers
Olympic footballers of North Korea
Footballers at the 1976 Summer Olympics
1980 AFC Asian Cup players
Place of birth missing (living people)
Association football midfielders
Footballers at the 1978 Asian Games
Asian Games medalists in football
Asian Games gold medalists for North Korea
Medalists at the 1978 Asian Games